Ascanio Albertini (1526–1580) was a Roman Catholic prelate who served as Bishop of Avellino e Frigento (1549–1580).

Biography
Ascanio Albertini was born in Nola, Italy in 1526.
On 10 May 1549, he was appointed during the papacy of Pope Paul III as Bishop of Avellino e Frigento.
He served as Bishop of Avellino e Frigento until his death in 1580.

Episcopal succession
While bishop, he was the principal co-consecrator:
Francesco Beltramini, Bishop of Terracina, Priverno e Sezze (1565);
Giovanni D'Amato, Bishop of Minori (1565); 
Miler Magrath, Bishop of Down and Connor (1565);
Nicolas Ugrinovich, Bishop of Smederevo (1565); and 
Beatus di Porta, Bishop of Chur (1565).

References

External links and additional sources
 (for Chronology of Bishops) 
 (for Chronology of Bishops) 

16th-century Italian Roman Catholic bishops
Bishops appointed by Pope Paul III
1526 births
1580 deaths